Dorian Lévêque (born 22 November 1989) is a French footballer who most recently played as a defender for Ligue 2 club Le Mans.

Career
Lévêque began his career in 2002 with FC Annecy, where he spent 13 years before signing for US Boulogne in 2008. He made his professional debut in Ligue 1 on 7 March 2010 against Olympique Lyonnais.

In June 2010 En Avant Guingamp signed him on a two-year-deal. He spent seven seasons with Guingamp, during which they climbed from France's third tier to Ligue 1, beat Stade Rennais in the 2014 Coupe de France Final, and played in the UEFA Europa League.

On 19 June 2017, Lévêque signed a three-year contract with PAOK. He played in one Super League match before suffering a serious injury, and lost the confidence of the manager. After a dispute between player, club and Hellenic Football Federation, he was finally able to terminate his contract in January 2019.

In February 2019, Lévêque rejoined his formative club, Annecy FC, after training with them for several weeks due to being without a club since the start of the season. The club announced on 6 June that he had left the club again, with the intention of finding a professional club. 

In July 2019, he signed for Le Mans, newly promoted to Ligue 2. Injury blighted the season, preventing him from making any first team appearances after August, and he left the club in the summer.

Honours
Guingamp
 Coupe de France: 2013–14

References

External links

1989 births
Living people
Sportspeople from Hyères
Association football defenders
French footballers
US Boulogne players
En Avant Guingamp players
FC Annecy players
PAOK FC players
Le Mans FC players
Ligue 1 players
Ligue 2 players
Championnat National 2 players
Championnat National 3 players
Championnat National players
Super League Greece players
Footballers from Provence-Alpes-Côte d'Azur